Paperback Ghosts is the seventh studio album by British Indie pop band Comet Gain. It was released in July 2014 under Fortuna Pop!.

Track list

References

2014 albums
Comet Gain albums
Fortuna Pop! Records albums